K V was a  patrol submarine of the Royal Netherlands Navy. The ship was built by Fijenoord shipyard in Rotterdam.

Service history
The submarine was laid down in Rotterdam at the shipyard of Fijenoord on 4 April 1916. The launch took place on 20 November 1919.
On 15 September 1920 the ship was commissioned in the Dutch navy.

18 October 1920 K V left the port of Den Helder for the Dutch East Indies her theater of operations. She made the journey without an escort. The route she took made stops at Tunis, the Suez Canal, Aden and Colombo to Surabaya, where she arrived on 26 January 1921.

In August 1937 the K V was decommissioned.

References

External links
Description of ship

1919 ships
Ships built in Schiedam
K V-class submarines